John William Honeyman (29 December 1893 – 1972) was an English professional footballer who played as a winger.

References

1893 births
1972 deaths
People from Middlesbrough
English footballers
Association football wingers
Middlesbrough F.C. players
Dundee F.C. players
Maidstone United F.C. (1897) players
Grimsby Town F.C. players
Chatham Town F.C. players
Margate F.C. players
New Bedford Whalers players
Pawtucket Rangers players
Folkestone F.C. players
English Football League players
English expatriate sportspeople in the United States
Expatriate soccer players in the United States
English expatriate footballers